The Cambrian School District is a school district based in the Cambrian district of San Jose, California. It operates four elementary schools (K-5), one middle school (6-8) and one alternative school. As of the 2011–12 fiscal year, the district has 142.8 full-time equivalent teachers serving 3,324 students.

Note: Based on 2006-07 school year data

References

External links